An Chi-hwan (Korean: 안치환, born 16 November 1965) is a South Korean singer, song-writer, and producer. A former member of Nochatsa, he is one of the notable 386 singer.

Biography 
Born in Hwaseong, An received a Bachelor in Social Work from Yonsei University. In 1984, the year when he registered to Yonsei University, he joined Ullimtu, the school's central band. He also joined the another band, Dawn, in 1986.

An joined Nochatsa (Song Finders) in 1988, and cooperated to release its 2nd studio album, Song Finders 2 in the following year. He recorded 2 songs — "At The Vast Field (광야에서)" and "Dried Leaves Revive (마른잎 다시 살아나)", and subsequently left the band. He then, however, unsuccessfully released the 1st studio album An Chi-hwan in 1990 and 2nd Song Festival in 1991; he later mentioned that he had a trouble with his label, and both were re-created as An Chi-hwan 1+2 in 1994, shortly after his 3rd album Confession.

An married to Kim Mi-ok in May 1998, and has a son and a daughter.

In 2014, An was diagnosed with rectal cancer. The next year, he released a new album 50 that consists of songs related to his health status. His most recent album is 53 released in 2018.

Discography

Nochatsa 
 Song Finders 2 (1989)

Studio album 
 An Chi-hwan (1990)
 Song Festival (1991)
 Confession (1993)
 An Chi-hwan 1+2 (1994)
 If I Were (1995)
 Nostalgia (1997)
 Desire (1997)
 I Still Believe (1999)
 Remember (2000)
 Good Luck (2001)
 Clamour (2004)
 Beyond Nostalgia (2006)
 An Chi-hwan 9 (2007)
 Song for Jeong Ho-seung (2008)
 Today Is Good (2010)
 50 (2015)
 53 (2018)

Compilation album 
 An Chi-hwan Song Festival (1994)
 An Chi-hwan Collections (2014)
 An Chi-hwan Anthology (2014)

Single album 
 Single 2012 (2012)
 Two Views Looking Power (2016)
 April Camellia (2018)
 Shouts of 100 Years (2019)

Live album 
 Live '01 ~ '02 (2002)
 Sing Alone'' (2012)

References

External links 
 Official website
 An Chi-hwan on Facebook

1965 births
Living people
People from Hwaseong, Gyeonggi
South Korean male singers